The Broadway Drifter is a 1927 American silent drama film directed by Bernard McEveety and starring George Walsh, Dorothy Hall and Arthur Donaldson.

Synopsis
A drifter who hangs around Broadway is disowned by his father. He tries to reform and find employment running a health institution for girls and later working at an airplane factory.

Cast
 George Walsh as Bob Stafford 
 Dorothy Hall as Eileen Byrne 
 Bigelow Cooper as Myron Stafford 
 Arthur Donaldson as Frank Harmon 
 Paul Doucet as Phil Winston 
 Nellie Savage as Mignon Renee 
 Gladys Valerie as Laura Morris 
 Donald Laskley as Sam 
 George Offerman Jr. as Tommy

References

Bibliography
 Munden, Kenneth White. The American Film Institute Catalog of Motion Pictures Produced in the United States, Part 1. University of California Press, 1997.

External links

1927 films
1927 drama films
Silent American drama films
Films directed by Bernard McEveety
American silent feature films
1920s English-language films
American black-and-white films
1920s American films